Worthy Down Halt railway station was built in 1918 as a small single platform halt to serve the Royal Flying Corps (later RAF) depot nearby. It included two passing loops (the shorter of which was used as a siding) to provide supplies to the site. Later, the station became a junction for a spur to connect with the Southern Railway line through Winchester. At this point an additional line was built on the opposite side of the station to provide an island platform serving both northbound and southbound trains on separate lines.

References

Disused railway stations in Hampshire
Former Great Western Railway stations
Railway stations in Great Britain opened in 1918
Railway stations in Great Britain closed in 1942
Railway stations in Great Britain opened in 1943
Railway stations in Great Britain closed in 1960
1918 establishments in England
1960 disestablishments in England